Kane Sinclair Crichlow (born 21 August 2000) is a Bermudian professional footballer who plays as a midfielder for Greek Super League 2 club Episkopi and the Bermuda national team.

Club career
In 2012, Crichlow left Bermuda to join the youth academy of Spanish side Cornellà. 

In November 2017, Crichlow appeared in a friendly on trial for AFC Wimbledon. By the following year, he was a member of the club's under-18 squad.

In May 2019, it was announced that Crichlow would join Watford in July from AFC Wimbledon, signing a two-year contract.

Crichlow made his professional debut for Watford on 22 September 2020 as a substitute in the EFL Cup against Newport County.

At the end of the 2021–22 season, it was announced that Crichlow would be leaving the club upon the end of his contract.

International career
Crichlow has represented Bermuda at under-15, under-17 and under-20 levels. In March 2021, he was called up by Bermuda for their CONCACAF Group B qualifiers against Canada and Aruba later that month. He made his debut on 25 March 2021 in a World Cup qualifier against Canada and scored his team's only goal as Canada won 5–1.

Career statistics

Club

International

International goals
Scores and results list Bermuda's goal tally first.

References

External links

2000 births
Living people
Bermudian footballers
Bermuda youth international footballers
Bermuda under-20 international footballers
Bermuda international footballers
Watford F.C. players
Association football midfielders
People from Warwick Parish
Bermudian expatriate footballers
Expatriate footballers in England
Bermudian expatriate sportspeople in Spain
Expatriate footballers in Greece
Episkopi F.C. players
Super League Greece 2 players